In mathematics, the cylindrical harmonics are a set of linearly independent functions that are solutions to Laplace's differential equation, expressed in cylindrical coordinates, ρ (radial coordinate), φ (polar angle), and z (height). Each function Vn(k) is the product of three terms, each depending on one coordinate alone. The ρ-dependent term is given by Bessel functions (which occasionally are also called cylindrical harmonics).

Definition
Each function  of this basis consists of the product of three functions:

where  are the cylindrical coordinates, and n and k are constants which distinguish the members of the set from each other. As a result of the superposition principle applied to Laplace's equation, very general solutions to Laplace's equation can be obtained by linear combinations of these functions.

Since all of the surfaces of constant ρ, φ and z  are conicoid, Laplace's equation is separable in cylindrical coordinates. Using the technique of the separation of variables, a separated solution to Laplace's equation may be written:

and Laplace's equation, divided by V, is written:

The Z  part of the equation is a function of z alone, and must therefore be equal to a constant:

where k  is, in general, a complex number. For a particular k, the Z(z) function has two linearly independent solutions. If k is real they are:

or by their behavior at infinity:

If k is imaginary:

or:

It can be seen that the Z(k,z) functions are the kernels of the Fourier transform or Laplace transform of the Z(z) function and so k may be a discrete variable for periodic boundary conditions, or it may be a continuous variable for non-periodic boundary conditions.

Substituting  for  , Laplace's equation may now be written:

Since  is periodic, we may take n to be a non-negative integer and accordingly, the  the constants are subscripted.

or, equivalently:

If k is zero, but n is not, the solutions are:

If both k and n are zero, the solutions are:

If k is a real number we may write a real solution as:

If k  is an imaginary number, we may write a real solution as:

The cylindrical harmonics for (k,n) are now the product of these solutions and the general solution to Laplace's equation is given by a linear combination of these solutions:

Note that the integral may be replaced by a sum for appropriate boundary conditions. The   and   functions are essentially Fourier or Laplace expansions, and form a set of orthogonal functions.

If  is the sequence of the positive zeros of  then:

In solving problems, the space may be divided into any number of pieces, as long as the values of the potential and its derivative match across a boundary which contains no sources.

Example: Point source inside a conducting cylindrical tube

(In MKS units, we will assume ). Since the potential is bounded by the planes on the z axis, the Z(k,z) function can be taken to be periodic. Since the potential must be zero at the origin, we take the  function to be the ordinary Bessel function , and it must be chosen so that one of its zeroes lands on the bounding cylinder. For the measurement point below the source point on the z axis, the potential will be:

Above the source point:

Point source inside cylinder

Removing the plane ends (i.e. taking the limit as L approaches infinity) gives the field of the point source inside a conducting cylinder:

Point source in open space

As the radius of the cylinder (a) approaches infinity, the sum over the zeroes of  becomes an integral, and we have the field of a point source in infinite space:

and R is the distance from the point source to the measurement point:

Point source in open space at origin

Finally, when the point source is at the origin,

See also
Spherical harmonics

Notes

References

 
 
 

Differential equations